Atracis is a genus of flatid planthopper with around 60 species distributed in the Oriental Realm and tropical Africa. 

 Atracis atkinsoni 
 Atracis castaneiceps 
 Atracis clypeata 
 Atracis consanguinea 
 Atracis conserta 
 Atracis conspurcata 
 Atracis costalis 
 Atracis crenata 
 Atracis cretacea 
 Atracis dissimilis 
 Atracis erosipennis 
 Atracis facialis 
 Atracis fasciata 
 Atracis fimbria 
 Atracis formasana 
 Atracis gibbosa 
 Atracis greeni 
 Atracis hainanensis 
 Atracis haragamensis 
 Atracis himalayana 
 Atracis inaequalis 
 Atracis indica 
 Atracis insularis 
 Atracis insurgens 
 Atracis intercepta 
 Atracis jangis 
 Atracis kotoshonis 
 Atracis lurida 
 Atracis maculipennis 
 Atracis mendax 
 Atracis mira 
 Atracis moelleri 
 Atracis mucida 
 Atracis munita 
 Atracis nalandensis 
 Atracis nietneri 
 Atracis nodosa 
 Atracis obscura 
 Atracis obtecta 
 Atracis perplaxa 
 Atracis pruinosa 
 Atracis puncticeps 
 Atracis pyralis 
 Atracis rivularis 
 Atracis sadeyana 
 Atracis scissa 
 Atracis scripta 
 Atracis servis 
 Atracis subrufescens 
 Atracis surrecta 
 Atracis surrecta var. a 
 Atracis tabida 
 Atracis termina 
 Atracis tuberculosa 
 Atracis variegata 
 Atracis vetusta

References

External links 
 FLOW database
 

Flatidae